Diego Amozurrutia Torres Landa (born August 31, 1990 in Mexico City, Distrito Federal Mexico) is a Mexican actor and model.

Biography 
Diego Amozurrutia appeared in the CEA of Televisa.

Presentations throughout the republic with the musical group Burundikids, pipes in caps Barcel promotional and advertising during television broadcasts of the program, The Challenge Burundis as flagship of the group Burundikids, participation in the dance group of Cómplices Al Rescate: Silvana lead vocals in the three accomplices to the rescue disks (Mariana, Silvana and the grand finale), cameo on the soap TV series Rebelde as Andy, stellar performance in La Rosa de Guadalupe as Douglass, starring in the second season starring Central de Abastos in one chapter, as Eros starring in the film: director Divina Confusión of  Salvador Garcini (2008), starring in the Fox series Tiempo Final as Mario (3rd season) in 2009, starring in the TV series Mi Pecado (Maite Perroni, Eugenio Siller) as Josué

In 2010, he joined the cast of the TV series Llena de amor, produced by Angelli Nesma.

A year later, in 2011, a new look and take part in the melodrama of the producer Lucero Suarez Amorcito Corazon.

In 2013 he was cast as Daniel Parra in Gossip Girl: Acapulco.

Filmography

Teatro 
 Hoy no me puedo levantar (Musical, 2014) – Personaje Colate

Telenovelas 
 Cabo (2022) – Eduardo Noriega Alargon
 Cuna de Lobos (2019) – Alejandro Larios Creel
 Entre correr y vivir (2016) – Guillermo Aldana
 Quiero Amarte (2013) – Ulises Orteaga
 Amorcito Corazon (2011) – Juancho Pinzon
 Llena de amor (2010) – Axel Ruiz y de Teresa Curiel
 Mi Pecado (2009) – Josué Huerta Almada
 Rebelde (2004–2006) – Andy

Films 
 Divina Confusión (2008) – Cupido, Actuación Especial
 Cindy la Regía (2020) 
– Eduardo

TV series 
 La Rosa de Guadalupe (2008) – Juanito Episode
 Tiempo Final Fox (2010) – Mario
 Como dice el dicho (2011)
 Gossip Girl: Acapulco (2013) – Daniel Parra

Discography 

 Cómplices Al Rescate: Silvana (2002)
 Cómplices Al Rescate: Mariana (2002)

  Disco con Burundikids
 El reto Burundis
 Muévete
 Dime
 Por ti
 No Pido más

Álbum como solista, Adelante
 Duele Perderte
 Hong Kong
 Sin Miedo
 Mujer Mágica

External links 
 In Esmas.com

References 

1990 births
Living people
Mexican male film actors
Mexican male models
Mexican male telenovela actors
Mexican male television actors
Male actors from Mexico City